Pond Creek is a stream in Washington County in the U.S. state of Missouri. It is a tributary of Mill Creek.

Pond Creek was so named on account of ponds near its headwaters.

See also
List of rivers of Missouri

References

Rivers of Washington County, Missouri
Rivers of Missouri